Zenssee is a lake in Uckermark, Brandenburg, Germany. At an elevation of, its surface area is 1.1167 km². It is located in the town of Lychen.

See also
Nesselpfuhl
Oberpfuhl
Wurlsee

Lakes of Brandenburg
Uckermark (district)
LZenssee